Orocrambus vulgaris is a moth in the family Crambidae. It was described by Arthur Gardiner Butler in 1877. It is endemic to New Zealand, where it has been recorded from the North Island and South Island. The species prefers habitat that consists of lowland and subalpine grasslands.

The wingspan is 21–25 mm. Adults have been recorded on wing from January to April.

References

Crambinae
Moths described in 1877
Endemic fauna of New Zealand
Moths of New Zealand
Taxa named by Arthur Gardiner Butler
Endemic moths of New Zealand